Omar Abdullah (born 10 March 1970) is an Indian politician and former Chief Minister of the erstwhile state of Jammu and Kashmir.

He became the 11th and the youngest Chief Minister of the State of Jammu and Kashmir, after forming a government in coalition with the Congress party, on 5 January 2009.

He was the last Leader of opposition in the erstwhile state Jammu and Kashmir Legislative Assembly (Member of the Legislative Assembly from Beerwah constituency of Budgam district) before the assembly was dissolved in 2018 and the state of Jammu & Kashmir ceased to exist as on 6 August 2019. On 6 February 2020 the Government of India booked him under the Public Safety Act (PSA) which was revoked on 24 March 2020.

He was a member of 14th Lok Sabha, representing Srinagar constituency of Jammu and Kashmir, India. He was the Union Minister of State for External affairs in Atal Bihari Vajpayee's NDA government, from 23 July 2001 to 23 December 2002. He resigned from NDA government in October 2002 to concentrate on party work.

Omar joined politics in 1998, as a Lok Sabha member, a feat he repeated in subsequent three elections and also remained the Union minister; he took on the mantle of National Conference from his father in 2002, though  lost his own seat of Ganderbal during the 2002 state assembly elections, and so did his party, the political mandate; four years later, he contested once again from the same seat and won in the 2008 Kashmir State Elections.<ref name=cnn>Omar Abdullah not just another political scion CNN-IBN, 5 Jan 2009.</ref>

Personal life
Omar Abdullah was born on 10 March 1970 in Rochford, Essex, United Kingdom. He is a grandson of Sheikh Abdullah, and the only son of Farooq Abdullah, a physician. All three men have held the position of Chief Minister of Jammu and Kashmir. His mother, Mollie, an Englishwoman and a nurse by profession, has said that she was not in favor of him joining politics. He studied at the Burn Hall School located at Sonwar Bagh, Srinagar and then at Lawrence School, Sanawar. He is a B.Com. graduate of Sydenham College of Commerce and Economics. He was employed with ITC Limited and The Oberoi Group till the age of 29 before entering politics. He did commence an MBA with the University of Strathclyde, however due his election to the Lok Sabha, he dropped out from the course.

He married Payal Nath from Delhi. She is the daughter of a retired army officer, Ram Nath. In September 2011, Omar confirmed that he and his wife have separated. His younger sister, Sara Pilot, is married to Sachin Pilot, son of Rajesh Pilot.

He had a role in director Apoorva Lakhia’s film, Mission Istanbul'' (2008) playing himself.

Political career
In 1998, at the age of 28, Omar Abdullah was elected to the 12th Lok Sabha, becoming the youngest member. In 1998–99, he was a member of both the Committee on Transport and Tourism and the Ministry of Tourism's Consultative Committee. In 1999, he was elected to 13th Lok Sabha (2nd term as a Member of Parliament). On 13 October 1999, he took oath as Union Minister of State, Commerce and Industry. On 22 July 2001, he became the youngest Union Minister, when he was made Union Minister of State for External Affairs. He resigned from the post on 23 December 2002, to concentrate on party work.

On 23 June 2002, he became the President of the National Conference party, replacing his father, Farooq Abdullah. He lost his Ganderbal seat in the Kashmir assembly elections held in September–October 2002. Abdullah was re-elected as the National Conference party's president in 2006.

In March 2006, much to the disapproval of the centre Omar Abdullah had a one-on-one meeting with Pakistan's president, Pervez Musharraf, in Islamabad. This was the first meeting of its kind between a mainstream politician from Jammu & Kashmir and the Pakistani government, thereby re-enforcing Omar's growing commitment to the solution of the Jammu & Kashmir cause.

On 22 July 2008, Omar gave a speech during the 2008 Lok Sabha vote of confidence, which was praised and won him fans on the internet.

After the 2008 Kashmir Elections, the National Conference won the maximum number of seats, and formed a coalition government with the Congress party, and Omar was sworn in as the 11th Chief Minister of Jammu and Kashmir on 5 January 2009 at the General Zoravar Singh Auditorium in the University of Jammu, Jammu, raising hope amongst the people of Jammu and Kashmir who had been reeling under insurgency and violence caused by cross border terrorism since 1989.

In 2009, Omar Abdullah was accused of covering up the rape and murder of two young women in Shopian, which was allegedly perpetrated by Indian Paramilitary Forces. Many regarded this as Abdullah's first failure, as even moderates felt Abdullah had bowed to pressure from New Delhi.

Detention
On the intervening night of 4 and 5 August 2019, Omar Abdullah was placed under preventive detention by the Indian Government under Section 107 of the CRPC. This came as a backdrop to the government's decision of scrapping Article 370 of the Constitution of India, which gave the state of Jammu & Kashmir semi-autonomous powers.

After the expiry of the six-month detention without any charges, Abdullah has been freshly charged and detained under the Public Safety Act (PSA) which has been revoked on 24 March 2020.

"The capacity of the subject to influence people for any cause can be gauged from the fact that he was able to convince his electorate to come out and vote in huge numbers even during peak of militancy and poll boycotts,"  the government dossier continues.

Abdullah's sister, Sara Abdullah Pilot has filed a writ petition in the Supreme Court challenging Abdullah's detention calling it "wholly antithetical to a democratic polity and undermines the Indian Constitution" and asking that the SC secure Abdullah's release.

The petition also includes a habeas corpus for Abdullah to be produced before the Supreme Court.

On 10 February 2020 Senior advocate Kapil Sibal, appearing for petitioner Sara Abdullah Pilot, mentioned the matter for urgent listing before a bench headed by Justice N V Ramana.

On 14 February 2020 the Supreme Court issued notice to the Jammu & Kashmir administration and set the next date of hearing as 2 March 2020.

On 24 March 2020 Omar Abdullah was released from detention. Following his release, he demanded other people held under detention be released as well.

References

External links

 Official biographical sketch in Parliament of India website

1970 births
Living people
People from Rochford
University of Mumbai alumni
Alumni of the University of Strathclyde
India MPs 1999–2004
India MPs 2004–2009
Chief Ministers of Jammu and Kashmir
Kashmiri people
Indian people of English descent
Lawrence School, Sanawar alumni
Omar
India MPs 1998–1999
Lok Sabha members from Jammu and Kashmir
Members of the Jammu and Kashmir Legislative Council
Jammu and Kashmir MLAs 2014–2018
Jammu and Kashmir MLAs 2008–2014
Chief ministers from Jammu & Kashmir National Conference
Jammu & Kashmir National Conference politicians